Shahrdari Varamin Volleyball Club (Bâshgâh-e Vâlibâl-e Shahrdâri-ye Varâmin) formerly known as Matin Varamin for sponsorship reasons is a professional volleyball team based in Varamin, Iran. They compete in the Iranian Volleyball Super League.

History

Establishment
Shahrdari Varamin Volleyball Club was founded in 2012 in Varamin, Iran, by the Matin Engineering Company. Matin was placed in the Iranian Super League for the 2012-13 season.

2012–13
In their first season Matin finished 2nd in the league with 42 points thus securing a play-off spot. In the semi-final round Matin defeated Saipa Alborz two games to one and advanced to the final, in which they faced Kalleh. Matin won the first game, but Kalleh bounced back winning the remaining two games and winning the Super League.

2013–14
In their second season, Matin again finished second in the league. This time the play-offs included a quarter-final phase, and Matin were paired up with Novin Keshavarz in which they comfortably won. In the semi-final Matin faced Mizan Khorasan, Matin again easily defeated their opposition and advanced to the final and for the second straight year they faced Kalleh Mazandaran. The finals was only a one match game in which Matin won three sets to two, thus winning their first title and clinching a spot in the Asian Club Championships. Matin easily won their group and advanced to the quarter-finals in which they defeated Chinese Taipei three sets to one. Matin then faced Beijing Motors in the semi-final, they easily beat Beijing three sets to none. In the final they were paired up with Persian Gulf rivals Al Rayyan of Qatar. Matin proved to be no match for Al Rayyan as they defeated the Qatari team three sets to one. By winning the Asian Club Championships they secured a spot in the World Club Championships. In their first group match, Matin were defeated three sets to none by Brazilian club Sada Cruzeiro. However, in their second match they bounced back defeating Mets of Cuba three sets to none. In their final group match, Matin faced Belogorie of Russia. A match they had to win to advance out of the group, unfortunately they were defeated three set to one, and finished fifth overall.

2018-19 
After winning the 2018-19 Iranian Volleyball Super League, Shahrdari Varamin qualified for the 2019 Asian men's Club Volleyball Championship. Competing in Pool B, the team won all 3 of their matches defeating Indonesian Polri Samator, and Turkeminstan's representative Galkan. They finished their pool matches defeating Sri Lanka Ports Authority 3-0. In the classification round, Shahrdari Varamin was placed in Pool F along with Panasonic Panthers, Sri Lanka Ports Authority, TP.HCM. Their only loss throughout the tournament came against Panasonic Panthers when they lost 2-3. They moved on to the quarterfinals as the second team from Pool F. They defeated Taichung Bank 3-0 in the quarterfinals, Chennai Spartans 3-1 in the semifinals, and took revenge against Panasonic Panthers in the final match defeating them 3-2 to win their second Asian Club Volleyball Championship. As a result of winning the Asian Club Championship, Shahrdari Varamin would represent the AVC in the 2019 Club World Championship, but they were banned by the FIVB for this tournament and replaced by 
Al-Rayyan.

Squad 

1.  Alireza Jalali
2.  Mehrad Ragani Babaei
3.  Mohammad Kashkami Zarchoub Fallah
4.  Behnam Ebrahimi
5.  Arash Seyed Taghavi
6.  Mohammad Razipoor
7.  Purya Samnani Fayazi
8.  Ahsanollah Shirkavand
11.  Rasoul Najafi
12.  Ehsan Daneshdoust
13.  Amin Razavi
14.  Parviz Pezeshki
17.  Majid Torabadi
18.  Javad Hosseinabadi

Club Names
This Club has Several Names for sponsorship reasons:

2012–2016:Matin Varamin

2016–2017:Matin Salehin Varamin

2017–Present:Shahrdari Varamin

Current squad
1.  Alireza Nasr Esfahani
2.  Mostafa Sharifat
5.  Mehdi Bazargard
6.  Hesan Bakhsheshi
7.  Hamzeh Zarini
8.  Ahsanollah Shirkavand
9.  Ali Asghar Razmfar
10.  Amir Ghafour
12.  Mehdi Faraji
14.  Arash Keshavarzi
15.  Andreas Fragkos
16.  Shahin Mofidi
17.  Mohammad Taher Vadi
18.  Saber Narimannejad
20.  Behnam Ebrahimi
Heach coach:  Behrouz Ataei
Assistant coach:  Slobodan Prakljačić

Honors
Iranian Super League
Winners (2): 2014, 2019
Runners-up (1): 2013

Asian Club Championship
Winners (2): 2014, 2019

Club World Championship
Fifth place (1): 2014

References 

 Rosters

External links
 worldofvolley.com
 Matin Varamin Volleyball Team Staff 2013

Iranian volleyball clubs
Sport in Varamin